The knockout stage of the 1962 FIFA World Cup was the second and final stage of the competition, following the group stage. The knockout stage began on 10 June with the quarter-finals and ended on 17 June 1962 with the final match, held at the Estadio Nacional in Santiago. The top two teams from each group (eight in total) advanced to the knockout stage to compete in a single-elimination style tournament. A third place play-off also was played between the two losing teams of the semi-finals.

Brazil won the final 3–1 against Czechoslovakia for their second World Cup title.

All times listed are local time.

Qualified teams
The top two placed teams from each of the four groups qualified for the knockout stage.

Bracket

Quarter-finals

Chile vs Soviet Union
Eleven minutes into the game Leonel Sánchez opened the score with a free kick from wide on the right that surprised Lev Yashin at the near post. Igor Chislenko equalized for the Soviet Union after picking up a deflected shot by Viktor Ponedelnik but almost immediately Eladio Rojas scored with an excellent low shot from distance. Chile managed to hold on to the result.

|valign="top" width="50%"|

|}

Czechoslovakia vs Hungary
In the first half a through-ball from Masopust cut out the Hungarian defense for Scherer to score. After that Schrojf made several saves to deny a Hungarian goal. Tichy once hit the bar but couldn't score. 

|valign="top" width="50%"|

|}

Brazil vs England
Garrincha opened the score at the half hour when he headed in a corner by Mário Zagallo. England equalized when Jimmy Greaves hit the bar with a looping header and Gerry Hitchens banged in an instant shot. Soon after halftime Brazil regained advantage after Vavá headed in a free kick from Garrincha and six minutes later the Brazilian right winger made it 3–1 with a curling shot into the top corner.

|valign="top" width="50%"|

|}

Yugoslavia vs West Germany
The first clear opportunity was for the Germans when Seeler hit the post with a low shot after running onto Haller's pass. Yugoslavia were also close to score but Schnellinger cleared the ball off the line following a corner. The only goal of the game came near the end when Galić pulled the ball back after working his way to the goal line and Radaković lashed it high into the net.

|valign="top" width="50%"|

|}

Semi-finals

Czechoslovakia vs Yugoslavia

|valign="top" width="50%"|

|}

Brazil vs Chile

|valign="top" width="50%"|

|}

Third place play-off

|valign="top" width="50%"|

|}

Final

References

External links
 1962 FIFA World Cup archive
 1962 Chile Statistics
 Los 32 partidos de la 7ª Copa

1962 FIFA World Cup
1962
Yugoslavia at the 1962 FIFA World Cup
West Germany at the 1962 FIFA World Cup
Brazil at the 1962 FIFA World Cup
Czechoslovakia at the 1962 FIFA World Cup
England at the 1962 FIFA World Cup
Chile at the 1962 FIFA World Cup
Soviet Union at the 1962 FIFA World Cup
Hungary at the 1962 FIFA World Cup